The Colina Formation is a geologic formation in Arizona and Mexico. It preserves fossils dating back to the Permian period.

See also 

 List of fossiliferous stratigraphic units in Arizona
 List of fossiliferous stratigraphic units in Mexico
 Paleontology in Arizona

References

External links 
 

Geologic groups of Arizona
Permian Arizona
Permian System of North America
Geologic formations of Mexico
Permian Mexico